Shaoguan City Xihe Sports Centre (Simplified Chinese: 韶关市西河体育中心) is a multi-use stadium in Shaoguan, Guangdong, China.  It is currently used mostly for football matches and athletics events. This stadium's capacity is 21,570 people.

Sports venues in Guangdong
Football venues in China
Buildings and structures in Shaoguan